Sir Bani Yas Airport  is an airport serving Sir Bani Yas Island in the United Arab Emirates.

Airlines And Destinations

See also
 Transport in the United Arab Emirates

References

 OurAirports - United Arab Emirates
  Great Circle Mapper - Sir Bani Yas
 Sir Bani Yas
 Google Earth

External links

Airports in the United Arab Emirates
Western Region, Abu Dhabi